Mystery Valley is a 1928 American silent Western film directed by J.P. McGowan and starring Buddy Roosevelt.

Cast
 Buddy Roosevelt as Steve Larkin
 Carol Lane as Marie Ladeaus
 Tom Bay as Dan Mason
 Art Rowlands
 Jimmy Kane

References

Bibliography
 Munden, Kenneth White. The American Film Institute Catalog of Motion Pictures Produced in the United States, Part 1. University of California Press, 1997.

External links
 

1928 films
1928 Western (genre) films
Films directed by J. P. McGowan
American black-and-white films
Rayart Pictures films
Silent American Western (genre) films
1920s English-language films
1920s American films